Mardi is a suburb of the Central Coast region of New South Wales, Australia. It is part of the  local government area. The origin of the name is an Aboriginal word meaning 'stone knife'.

References

Suburbs of the Central Coast (New South Wales)